The accessory hemiazygos vein, also called the superior hemiazygous vein, is a vein on the left side of the vertebral column that generally drains the fourth through eighth intercostal spaces on the left side of the body.

Structure 
The accessory hemiazygos vein varies inversely in size with the left superior intercostal vein.

It usually receives the posterior intercostal veins from the 4th, 5th, 6th, 7th, and 8th intercostal spaces between the left superior intercostal vein and highest tributary of the hemiazygos vein; the left bronchial vein sometimes opens into it.

The vein usually crosses the body of the eighth thoracic vertebra to join the azygos vein. Alternatively, it ends in the hemiazygos vein.

When this vein is small, or altogether absent, the left superior intercostal vein may extend as low as the fifth or sixth intercostal space.

References 

Veins of the torso